Osama El-Rady (Mecca 1930–October 30, 2005) has been called the founding father of modern psychiatry in Saudi Arabia.

After his early schooling in Cairo, El-Rady received an MD degree from Ain Shams University, then pursued Western-style psychiatric training in Beirut under World Health Organization auspices in 1965.  At that time, the kingdom's approach to people with severe and persistent mental illness was overwhelmingly custodial.  Appointed director of Shehar Mental Hospital in Taif, Dr. El-Rady undertook to organize formal treatment programs.  He expanded this campaign when given charge of all psychiatric units in Saudi Arabia in the early 1970s, opening outpatient psychiatric clinics.

El-Rady strongly advocated adapting Western psychiatric approaches to Islamic tradition and culture.  Together with Dr. Gamal Abou El-Azayem and Prof. Rasheed Chaudry he helped found the World Islamic Association for Mental Health (WIAMH)  and became its first president.

References 

1930 births
2005 deaths
Ain Shams University alumni
Saudi Arabian psychiatrists
20th-century Saudi Arabian physicians